Thomas Y. Crowell Co. was a publishing company founded by Thomas Y. Crowell. The company began as a bookbindery founded by Benjamin Bradley in 1834. Crowell operated the business after Bradley's death in 1862 and eventually purchased the company from Bradley's widow in 1870.

History
The company began publishing books in 1876, and in 1882 T. Irving Crowell joined his father in the business. Jeremiah Osborne Crowell became the sales manager.

In 1909, after Thomas Y. Crowell died, T. Irving Crowell became the company's president. Then in 1937, after T. Irving Crowell retired, the third generation Robert L. Crowell took over and moved towards publishing trade books and biographies. They were sold to Dun & Bradstreet in 1968.

In 1974, Crowell acquired the textbook publisher Intext, which also owned the trade publisher Abelard-Schuman. In 1978, the company was sold to Harper & Row, which bought Lippincott and combined the two into Lippincott & Crowell in 1979. Lippincott & Crowell was merged into Harper & Row in 1980.

Published works

Reference works
The French Revolution, A History (1 volume), 1893  
Works of Washington Irving  
 Roget's Thesaurus International 
The Dictionary of Business and Finance
 a Social Studies Series
The Radio Amateur's Handbook (at least 1964–1970)
Benet's Reader's Encyclopedia
 The Soldiers' Diary and Note Book, revised edition
 Dictionary of American Slang, 1960
 Motion Pictures in Education

Non fiction
Cheaper by the Dozen, 1948, by Frank Bunker Gilbreth Jr. and Ernestine Gilbreth Carey

Fiction
Frank Heller detective/mystery series, 
The Works of William Shakespeare by William Shakespeare (undated) 
Eight books in the Nine to Twelve Series for older children 
The Children of the Valley by Harriet Prescott Spofford 
Little Dick's Son by Kate Gannett Wells 
Marcia & the Major by J.L. Harbour 
 Song of the Bell by Friedrich Schiller 
How Dexter Paid His Way by Kate Upson Clark 
The Flatiron and the Red Cloak by Abby Morton Diaz 
In the Poverty Year by Marian Douglas 
Little Sky-High by Hezekiah Butterworth 
The Little Cave-Dwellers by Ella Farman Pratt 
The Poetical Works of John Milton by John Milton
Westward the Sun by Brigid Knight (1942)
 The Betsy-Tacy books by Maud Hart Lovelace
"Jed - A Boy's Adventure in the Army of 61-65 - A Story of Battle and Prison, of Peril and Escape" by Warren Lee Goss
"Poems, Plays and Essays" of Oliver Goldsmith, M.B.
"Poems: 'Longfellow's Early Poems" by Henry Wadsworth Longfellow
Poems:Selections From The Poetical Works of Robert Browning Second Series 
"Poems: 'The Courtship of Miles Standish'" by Henry Wadsworth Longfellow
"Poems: 'The Complete Poetical Works of Robert Burns" © 1900  
"Poems: 'The Poems of Robert Louis Stevenson, with an Introduction by William Peterfield Trent" (1900)
"Poems: 'Idylls of the King' by Alfred Lord Tennyson (1885)
"Poems: 'Proctor's Poems'" by Adelaide Anne Proctor (1880)
"Poems: 'Macaulay's Poems" by Lord Thomas Macaulay
Rifles for Watie by Harold Keith (1957) (1958 Newbery Award)
Faust: A Tragedy. by Goethe, Ed. F.H. Hedge, D.D.
Cranford by Mrs. Gaskell 
 Ivanhoe: A Romance, by Sir Walter Scott, Bart., 1898 (illustrated by Allan Stewart)
 Father Fox's Pennyrhymes, children's book of poetry by Clyde Watson, with illustrations by her sister, Wendy Watson
Wordsworth's Complete Poetical Works...New York Thomas Y. Crowell Company Publishers (The Complete Poetical works of William Wordsworth with an introduction by John Morley dated 1888) 
Elegy Written in a Country Churchyard by Thomas Gray ... New York Thomas Y. Crowell & Co. Publishers

Book series
 Astor Edition of Poetry
 Astor Edition of Prose
 Astor Library of Standard Literature
 Children's Favorite Classics
 Crowell's Colonial Series 
 Crowell's Red Line Poets
 Famous Men and Women Library 
 Half-Hour Classics
 Handy Volume Classics
 Luxembourg Edition
 Luxembourg Illustrated Classics Series
 Luxembourg Illustrated Library
 Masters of Contemporary Photography
 Popular Books for Young People (also known as: Crowell's Library for Young People) 
 Sunday School Library, No. 1
 Well Spent Hour Library  
 What is Worth While Series

References

Defunct book publishing companies of the United States
Publishing companies established in 1834
1834 establishments in the United States